Fritz Wagner may refer to:

 Fritz Wagner (entomologist) (fl. 1900–1938), Austrian entomologist
 Fritz Wagner (footballer), Swiss footballer
 Fritz Arno Wagner (1889–1958), German cinematographer
 Fritz Wagner (actor) (1915–1982), German actor
 Friedrich Wagner, German physicist who discovered the high-confinement mode